Gazole railway station is a station on the Eklakhi–Balurghat branch line in West Bengal, India. This railway station is situated at Gazole Town, Malda district.

References

Railway stations in Malda district
Railway stations opened in 2004
Katihar railway division